Simple Data Format (SDF) is a platform-independent, precision-preserving binary data I/O format capable of handling  large, multi-dimensional arrays.  It was written in 2007 by George H. Fisher, a researcher at the Space Sciences Laboratory at UC Berkeley, and released under the GNU General Public License.

See also
 FITS
 HDF5
 CSV
 List of file formats
 NetCDF

External links
 The Simple Data Format Manifesto
 A .pdf Introduction to SDF
 SDF packages, each release as a tarball

Computer file formats